Harpreet Singh (born 8 September 1982) is a retired Indian professional footballer who has five senior team appearances for India national football team as a centre back and also played for JCT FC and Mohun Bagan AC alongside the Indian Super League side FC Pune City.

Career
Singh made his debut for Sporting Goa in the I-League on 10 April 2016 against Shillong Lajong. He came on as a 64th minute substitute for Fulganco Cardozo.

Harpreet was picked by Pune City in 2017–18 ISL Players Draft.

References

External links 
 

Living people
Indian footballers
Sporting Clube de Goa players
Association football defenders
I-League players
Indian Super League players
FC Pune City players
1982 births
Footballers from Jalandhar